Church Street Historic District is a national historic district located at Richfield Springs in Otsego County, New York.  It encompasses 76 contributing buildings, one contributing site, and one contributing object. It consists of a middle class residential area developed between about 1822 and 1940 and primarily characterized by two story frame houses in a variety of popular 19th- and early 20th-century architectural styles.

It was listed on the National Register of Historic Places in 1997.

References

Historic districts on the National Register of Historic Places in New York (state)
Houses on the National Register of Historic Places in New York (state)
Queen Anne architecture in New York (state)
1820s architecture in the United States
Historic districts in Otsego County, New York
National Register of Historic Places in Otsego County, New York